Lakeland is a city in Shelby County, Tennessee, United States, and a part of the Memphis metropolitan area. The population was 12,430 at the 2010 census.

Geography

Demographics

2020 census

As of the 2020 United States Census, there were 13,904 people, 4,148 households, and 3,322 families residing in the city.

2000 census
Current population from the 2010 census is 12,430. At the 2000 census there were 6,862 people, 2,748 households, and 2,025 families living in the city. The racial makeup of the city was 91.56% White, 5.22% African American, 0.13% Native American, 1.78% Asian, 0.50% from other races, and 0.82% from two or more races. Hispanic or Latino of any race were 1.47%.

Of the 2,748 households 34.0% had children under the age of 18 living with them, 63.9% were married couples living together, 7.3% had a female householder with no husband present, and 26.3% were non-families. 22.0% of households were one person and 4.5% had someone living alone who was 65 years of age or older. The average household size was 2.50 and the average family size was 2.94.

The age distribution was 24.6% under the age of 18, 6.4% from 18 to 24, 37.2% from 25 to 44, 23.8% from 45 to 64, and 7.9% who were 65 years of age or older. The median age was 35 years. For every 100 females there were 95.1 males. For every 100 females age 18 and over, there were 94.5 males.

The median household income was $58,897 and the median family income  was $64,444. Males had a median income of $46,750 versus $32,366 for females. The per capita income for the city was $28,956. About 2.2% of families and 3.0% of the population were below the poverty line, including 4.4% of those under age 18 and 2.8% of those age 65 or over.

Education
Lakeland is served by the Lakeland School System (LSS) and Arlington Community Schools.

Assigned schools are as follows:

Lakeland Elementary School (Grades K-4)

Lakeland Preparatory School (Grades 5-9)

Arlington High School (Grades 9-12)

NOTE: Students in grades 10-12 living in Lakeland are zoned attend Arlington High School through an inter-local agreement with Arlington Community Schools.

History
The city was the location of the now defunct Lakeland Amusement Park.  It had two railroads within the park property, including the  narrow gauge Huff 'n' Puff Railroad and a separate  miniature railway railroad made by the Allan Herschell Company.

References

External links
 Lakeland, Tennessee is at coordinates .

Cities in Tennessee
Cities in Shelby County, Tennessee
Memphis metropolitan area